The men's 100 metre freestyle event at the 1976 Summer Olympics took place between July 24 and 25. This was the first time in history that the 100m freestyle was swum under 50 seconds. There were 41 competitors from 27 nations. Nations had been limited to three swimmers each since the 1924 Games (except in 1960, when the limit was two). The event was won by Jim Montgomery of the United States, the nation's second consecutive and tenth overall victory in the men's 100 metre freestyle (most of any nation). His countryman Jack Babashoff took silver. Peter Nocke's bronze was the first medal for West Germany in the event, though the United Team of Germany had won a bronze in 1964 (by West German Hans-Joachim Klein).

Background

This was the 17th appearance of the men's 100 metre freestyle. The event has been held at every Summer Olympics except 1900 (when the shortest freestyle was the 200 metres), though the 1904 version was measured in yards rather than metres.

Three of the eight finalists from the 1972 Games returned: bronze medalist Vladimir Bure of the Soviet Union, seventh-place finisher Michel Rousseau of France, and eighth-place finisher Klaus Steinbach of West Germany. Reigning gold medalist Mark Spitz had retired after the 1972 Games at the age of 22. The new American favorite was Jim Montgomery, who had set the world record at the 1975 AAU championships. His main challenger would have been Jonty Skinner, but apartheid South Africa was banned from the Olympics. Montgomery had finished third at the 1975 world championships behind Andy Coan (not competing in Montreal) and Bure.

Bulgaria, Ecuador, Nicaragua, and the Virgin Islands each made their debut in the event. The United States made its 17th appearance, having competed at each edition of the event to date.

Competition format

The competition used a three-round (heats, semifinals, final) format. The advancement rule followed the format introduced in 1952, though with 2 semifinals. Swim-offs were used as necessary to break ties. A swimmer's place in the heat was not used to determine advancement; instead, the fastest times from across all heats in a round were used. There were 6 heats, with between 6 and 8 swimmers each. The top 16 swimmers advanced to the semifinals. There were 2 semifinals of 8 swimmers each. The top 8 swimmers advanced to the final.

This swimming event used freestyle swimming, which means that the method of the stroke is not regulated (unlike backstroke, breaststroke, and butterfly events). Nearly all swimmers use the front crawl or a variant of that stroke. Because an Olympic size swimming pool is 50 metres long, this race consisted of two lengths of the pool.

Records

Prior to this competition, the existing world and Olympic records were as follows.

Jim Montgomery broke the world record in the first semifinal, posting a 50.39 second time. In the final, he was the first swimmer to break the 50-second barrier, winning in 49.99 seconds for the new world record.

Schedule

All times are Eastern Daylight Time (UTC-4)

Results

Heats

 Swim-off

Semifinals

Final

References

Men's freestyle 100 metre
Men's events at the 1976 Summer Olympics